Richard Wilding  (born 8 May 1965) is a British academic and business professional specialising in logistics, transport and supply chain management.  He is recognised as one of the world's leading experts in logistics and supply chain management.

He is Immediate Past Chairman of the Chartered Institute of Logistics and Transport U.K., the international professional membership organisation for professionals involved in the movement of goods and people and their associated supply chains. He is also Emeritus Professor of Supply Chain Strategy at Cranfield University.

Early life 
Wilding was born in Sheffield, Yorkshire, England and is the son of Christine and Malcolm Wilding.  He was educated at Princethorpe College, Warwickshire. His father, a physicist, worked at the University of Sheffield. Wilding revealed in an interview to The Star Newspaper, Sheffield that he learnt to walk on the corridors of the physics department. It is reported he struggled at school from an eye tracking problem that was not diagnosed until into his teens, resulting in him struggling with school examinations.

Education 
Wilding studied Material Science and Technology at the University of Sheffield, graduating in 1987. He completed his Doctorate, 'Uncertainty generation in supply chains', part-time while in employment at the University of Warwick, graduating in 1998.

Career 
After graduating he spent a number of years working in industry before “accidentally falling into academia”, joining the Warwick Manufacturing Group in 1991.  In 1998 he moved to Cranfield University and was promoted to Professor and Chair of Supply Chain Risk Management in 2006.  His is recognised as one of the "Fathers" of this subject discipline This role evolved and he is currently Professor of Supply Chain Strategy. In this position he has taken on various other posts including Director, Trustee and Chairman of the Chartered Institute of Logistics and Transport between 2011 and 2019 and Director and Trustee of the Chartered Institute of Procurement and Supply in 2020. He was appointed a National Teaching Fellow in 2019 specializing in andragogy within a business context .

He has worked with BBC News in writing and discussing supply chain management, and in particular home delivery issues He has worked with Channel 4 on a Dispatches programme “Where’s my missing mail” and published in the Financial Times. He was one of the first to warn of the impending supply chain disruptions of COVID-19 and his advice and insights into the impacts of the coronavirus pandemic were heavily cited by the world media (for example) He took part in a notable television debate on U.K. national television  “Good Morning Britain” advising on the unintended consequences of the Consumer stockpiling on the supply chain.

His passion is described as “creating action in industry to increase value to customers and reduce costs”

He is best known for his innovative approaches to global logistics and supply chain management, his significant impact on the profession and his online videos and education courses.  Wilding was an early adopter of using vodcasts, podcasts and MOOCs for supply chain education including a YouTube Channel and a successful iTunesU business course "Supply Chain Management & Logistics: An introduction to Principles and Concepts".

In 2022 he launched a highly subscribed Linkedin Learning Course “Building Resilient Supply Chains for Effective Risk Management”

Awards, honours and recognition 
Wilding has received many awards for his work and impact on global business. He was appointed Officer of the Most Excellent Order of the British Empire (OBE) in the Queen's 2013 New Year Honours for service to business.  In 2017 he was awarded the "Lifetime contribution to training and development in Logistics" at the Logistics Talent Awards, the citation states " ....has been inspiring and motivating individuals and companies through his passionate sharing of logistics and supply chain knowledge. His lifetime contribution to the sector is second to none" He was awarded The Viscount Nuffield Silver Medal for Achievement in Design and Production in 2013 recognising him as "an innovator and educator. He has championed and developed new approaches within the engineering supply chains of countless organisations through his technical leadership for over 20 years” He was Winner of the European Supply Chain Excellence Awards Individual contribution award in 2010 and the European Supply Chain Distinction Award “Distinguished Service Award for Thought Leadership and Service to Supply Chain Management”.

Wilding has been listed in the SHD Magazine Logistics 100 since 2015, a definitive list of the U.K. logistics industry's most influential individuals.  He was awarded the "Logistics 100 Award" in 2017; this award singles out an individual in the list who has in the previous year created significant impact within the profession. Thus identifying him as the top U.K. logistics professional of 2017.  In the refocused 2019 list, utilizing new judging criteria, he was recognized as one of the Top 5 outside influencers of the logistics profession from academia, trade associations and future skills networks  Professor Wilding was recognized as the No.1 outside influencer from U.K. academia. He is recognised as one of the Top 10 Supply Chain Global Influencers on LinkedIn: A list of the top supply chain influencers out of the 660,000,000 Linkedin users in 200 countries and territories across the globe. He is also rated as the No.1 Supply Chain Power Influencer on Twitter since 2014.  He is listed in Who's Who (A.C. Black) and Debrett's and Marquis Who's Who.

Wilding has been listed in the "2018 Top 100 Corporate Modern Slavery Influencers Index” recognising individuals from all business sectors, media and academia who are influence leaders in raising awareness to end modern slavery and labour exploitation. The Index recognises individuals from all business sectors, media and academia who are influence leaders in raising awareness to end modern slavery and labour exploitation; those who advocate for robust ethical sourcing and human rights recognition and practices in UK direct business operations and global supply chains.

In January 2019 he was published in a list of the Top 50 influencers in e-commerce and shipping.  A list of the top 50 global experts and commentators who the top 1000 high-profile international professionals working in the e-commerce and delivery space follow, listen to and consult online.

He was awarded U.K. National Teaching Fellowship in 2019 the most prestigious, internationally acclaimed and highly coveted national award, recognizing individuals who have made an outstanding impact on student outcomes and the teaching profession within U.K. Higher Education

The Chartered Institute of Logistics and Transport U.K. awarded him the Institutes "Meritorious Service Award" in recognition of outstanding contribution and service to the Institute in the UK, its members and the continuing development of the logistics and transport profession in December 2019 and in 2022 he was awarded “The Sir Robert Lawrence Award 2021”, the premier award of the Chartered Institute of Logistics and Transport. First presented in 1986, it recognises an individual's outstanding and sustained contribution to the profession of logistics and transport.

In March 2018, Reading Buses named a low-carbon bio-gas double deck bus after "Richard Wilding OBE" in recognition of his work across the logistics world and the close ties Reading Buses has with the Chartered Institute of Logistics and Transport and its continued commitment to the development of both its people and its business, including learnings from outside of the bus industry.

His Fellowships include Fellow of the Institution of Engineering & Technology (FIET), Fellow of the Chartered Institute of Logistics & Transport (FCILT), Fellow of the Chartered Institute of Procurement & Supply (FCIPS) and Principal Fellow of the Higher Education Academy (PFHEA).

Personal life 
Richard lives near Rugby, Warwickshire. He is Vice Patron of Bedfordshire Opportunities for Learning Disabilities (previously Beds Garden Carers), a day care and education centre for individuals with learning disabilities and challenging behaviours. He also actively supports his local community in Rugby, Warwickshire. He has acted as judge for the annual Women in Logistics Awards.

References

External links 

 

1965 births
British business executives
Businesspeople from Sheffield
Officers of the Order of the British Empire
Living people
Alumni of the University of Sheffield
Alumni of the University of Warwick
People educated at Princethorpe College
Academics of Cranfield University
Principal Fellows of the Higher Education Academy